Russell Edmonds Carter, Jr. (born February 10, 1962) is a former American college and professional football player who was a safety in the National Football League (NFL) for six seasons during the 1980s.  Carter played college football for Southern Methodist University, and then played professionally for the New York Jets and Los Angeles Raiders of the NFL.

Early life and education
Carter was born in Ardmore, Pennsylvania, a suburb of Philadelphia. He attended Lower Merion High School in Ardmore prior to attending Southern Methodist University in Dallas, Texas, and playing for the SMU Mustangs football team from 1980 to 1983.  He was recognized as a consensus first-team All-American in 1983 and was the 10th pick overall in the 1984 NFL draft.

Professional career
In six NFL seasons, Carter appeared in sixty-four games, started forty-seven of them, intercepted four passes, and recovered three fumbles.

References

1962 births
Living people
African-American players of American football
All-American college football players
American football cornerbacks
American football safeties
Los Angeles Raiders players
New York Jets players
SMU Mustangs football players
Players of American football from Philadelphia
21st-century African-American people
20th-century African-American sportspeople